HNLMS Buffel is a 19th-century ironclad ram ship. She was one of the main attractions of the Maritime Museum Rotterdam, also known as the Prince Hendrik Museum, named after its founder, Prince Henry (Hendrik) "The Navigator", who had a naval career and established the basis of the museum back in 1874. In October 2013 the ship moved to Hellevoetsluis and is again open for public.

Construction and design 
Built in 1868 by Robert Napier and Sons in Glasgow, Scotland, HNLMS Buffel was the first ship of the Royal Netherlands Navy without sails but with a steam engine and two propellers, that gave her a maximum speed of almost . Her main task as an armor-clad ram ship was to play a role in the Dutch coastal defense together with two sister ships and two monitors.

Her armament was first of all the ram on her bow, mainly against wooden ships, and originally two ,  Armstrong guns, with a total weight of 25 metric tons, in one turret. These were later replaced by a single  gun, and the armament was enhanced by a couple of smaller guns; two , four , and two Hotchkiss revolving cannons.

The crew consisted of 150 officers, petty officers, and sailors.

Service record 
The ship's only ocean voyage took place on her maiden trip in 1868 from Glasgow to Den Helder. During the voyage, the vessel rolled very much and took on a lot of water. From that day on Buffel remained in the North Sea (in accordance with her role) and her only foreign port of call was Antwerp, Belgium in 1871.

Buffel participated in many national exercises with the Royal Netherlands Army until 1894 when she was retired from active duty. This was followed by a short, two-year period as a training ship for and from 1896 she acted as a lodging or accommodation ship. She was berthed in several naval establishments in the Netherlands, the last 25 years mainly in Amsterdam. She had the (NATO) pennant number A 884 on her bow, A for Auxiliary and 8 as the first cipher for all Royal Netherlands naval ships.

In 1973 Buffel was decommissioned. In 1974, the vessel was sold to the city of Rotterdam to be modified into a museum ship. From 1979 she was opened for visitors. The ship was moved to Hellevoetsluis in 2013 in order to cut costs. Buffel arrived there on 5 October and was moored temporarily in the brick-built Jan Blanken dry dock. This was all done on a three-year lease. On 7 February 2015 she arrived at her final berthing place at the Koningskade 2, in Het Groote Dock in Hellevoetsluis, where a historic naval quarter has been developed. Positioned here are: Buffel, Bernisse, an old minesweeper, and Noord Hinder a former lightship on the North Sea. The ship is now operated by volunteers from Stichting Museumschip de Buffel.

In October 2016 Stichting Museumschip de Buffel decided not to renew the three year lease. The group of volunteers then took up the idea to try to save the historical value of the ship for the future. In co-operation with the municipal councils of Rotterdam and Hellevoetsluis, this will be tried out in the coming year 2017.

See also
HNLMS Schorpioen
List of museum ships

Bibliography

External links 

Photo-collection on Dutch ironclads
HNSA Web Page: HNLMS Buffel
Stichting Ramtorenschip Buffel

Museum ships in the Netherlands
19th-century naval ships of the Netherlands
1868 ships
Tourist attractions in Rotterdam
Naval ships of the Netherlands captured by Germany during World War II
Buffel-class monitors
Ships built on the River Clyde